The 2007–08 season was the 110th season of competitive football played by Arsenal. The club ended their Premier League campaign in third position, having led the table for two-thirds of the season. Arsenal made it into the quarter-finals of the UEFA Champions League, but were eliminated on aggregate score against Liverpool. The team exited the FA Cup in the fifth round to Manchester United and lost in the semi-finals of the League Cup to Tottenham Hotspur. This was Arsenal's first hat-trick of trophyless seasons since 1997.

Arsenal sold striker and club record goalscorer Thierry Henry to Barcelona, in the transfer window. Other departures included first team players Freddie Ljungberg and José Antonio Reyes to West Ham United and Atlético Madrid respectively; defender Bacary Sagna and striker Eduardo were the notable purchases from Auxerre and Dinamo Zagreb, respectively.

A strong start to the season saw Arsenal top the league table by September. Defeat against Sevilla in November ended a run of 28 matches undefeated and it was not until a month after did the team lose in the league for the first time, away at Middlesbrough. Arsenal extended their league lead to five points in February, but a career-threatening injury to Eduardo against Birmingham City coincided with the team going on a run of four draws in the Premier League. Manchester United soon overtook them in first and defeat to Chelsea in March moved Arsenal down in third place, where they remained at the end of the season. However, their points tally of 83 remains as the highest in the Premier League for a third-placed team under the 38 game format.

Thirty-two different players represented the club in four competitions, and there were 16 different goalscorers. Emmanuel Adebayor was Arsenal's top goalscorer in the 2007–08 season, scoring 30 goals in 48 appearances.

Background

The previous season was a transitional period for Arsenal. The club transferred a number of first-team players such as defenders Sol Campbell and Lauren to Portsmouth and winger Robert Pires to Spanish club Villarreal. After lengthy negotiations, Ashley Cole moved to Chelsea on the final day of the summer transfer window, in exchange for £5 million and defender William Gallas. Arsenal played their home games at the newly constructed Emirates Stadium and drew their first game against Aston Villa. After a defeat by Bolton Wanderers, manager Arsène Wenger admitted that his team were unlikely to make a serious challenge for the Premier League. Despite being a young and inexperienced team, however, Arsenal reached the final of the League Cup, where they were beaten 2–1 by Chelsea. Elimination in the UEFA Champions League in the knockout stage (two-legged matches played home and away) and FA Cup in the space of four days followed – the club lost three games in succession for the first time since October 2002. Arsenal eventually finished fourth in the league, level on points with third-placed Liverpool.

Transfers
At the end of the 2006–07 season, Arsenal transferred Fabrice Muamba to Birmingham City and released Mart Poom, who subsequently joined Watford on a free transfer. Jérémie Aliadière moved to Middlesbrough in a £2 million deal while club captain and record goalscorer Thierry Henry left to join Barcelona for a reported fee of £16 million. Henry commented that his decision to leave Arsenal was because of the departure of chairman David Dein and the uncertainty over Wenger's future. Midfielder Freddie Ljungberg and striker José Antonio Reyes departed the club in July 2007, moving to West Ham United and Atlético Madrid respectively. Other players, Arturo Lupoli, Ryan Garry and Joe O'Cearuill, left on free transfers. Defender Matthew Connolly, who joined Colchester United on loan for a six-month period, later signed for Queens Park Rangers.

Legia Warsaw goalkeeper Łukasz Fabiański was the first player Arsenal recruited of the new season. Next to arrive was striker Eduardo, who signed from Dinamo Zagreb, shortly followed by French defender Bacary Sagna. Lassana Diarra was purchased on transfer deadline day from Chelsea, but later transferred to Portsmouth in January after he was frustrated at limited playing time; he said, "I read that the club [Arsenal] wanted to keep me. But when you want to keep someone, you do it by playing them. This hasn't been the case."

In

Out

Loans out

Club

Coaching staff

Kit
Supplier: Nike / Sponsor: Fly Emirates

Kit information
Nike released new kit for Arsenal this season.
Home: The home kit from last season was unchanged.
Away: The away kit with a design that celebrates the pioneering spirit of club legendary Herbert Chapman, and sees a return to the white away shirts worn throughout the club's history. The shirt incorporates a tonal print in a horizontal stripe, detailing many of Chapman's groundbreaking innovations which among others include the introduction of the white ball, rubber studs and numbered shirts. The Gunners legend also campaigned for Gillespie Road tube station to be changed to Arsenal tube station - the setting for the print adverts - to further promote the club's name, and was successful with its renaming in 1932. The kit with a redcurrant v-neck collar and a red currant trim to the sleeves - the hooped design another of the ideas that Chapman introduced to the club along with his inspiration for Arsenal's famous red and white shirt.
Third: The third kit featured with hooped dark-redcurrant shirts with gold trim in side collar, dark shorts and hooped redcurrant in dark socks with gold stripes, same as the away kit to commemorate the influence and achievements of under club legend Herbert Chapman.
Keeper: The goalkeeper kit are yellow. grey and navy blue.

Other information

Pre-season

Premier League

Twenty teams competed in the Premier League in the 2007–08 season. Each team played 38 matches, two against every other team and one match at each club's stadium. Three points were awarded for each win, one point per draw, and none for defeats. At the end of the season, the top two teams qualified for the group stages of the UEFA Champions League; teams in third and fourth needed to play a qualifier.

The provisional fixture list was released on 14 June 2007, but was subject to change in the event of clashes with other competitions, inclement weather, or matches being selected for television coverage.

August–October

Arsenal started their league campaign at home to Fulham on 12 August 2007. A mistake by goalkeeper Jens Lehmann, "screw[ing] an attempted return pass against his own knee", allowed striker David Healy to score, just under 52 seconds. However, a late penalty scored by Robin van Persie and a goal from Alexander Hleb resulted in the team winning the match. In their next match, away to Blackburn Rovers, another error by Lehmann – this time letting David Dunn's shot slip through his fingers and into the goalnet, meant the team drew 1–1. Cesc Fàbregas scored the winning goal against Manchester City, ten minutes before the end of the match. The result was followed with what The Guardian described as a "fluent attacking display" at home to Portsmouth, on the first day of September. Arsenal faced local rivals Tottenham Hotspur after a week-long international break and went a goal behind when Gareth Bale's free-kick beat goalkeeper Manuel Almunia, past the net. Emmanuel Adebayor scored the equaliser in the second half, before Fàbregas "piloted a 30-yarder beyond Paul Robinson in the 80th minute." In stoppage time, Adebayor flicked the ball up and volleyed it into the top corner of Tottenham's goal; the result meant Arsenal went top of the league table, for the first time in the season. A week after, Adebayor scored a hat-trick (three goals) in a 5–0 win against Derby County. Van Persie scored the only goal against West Ham United on 29 September 2007 to maintain the lead at the top.

Two goals from Van Persie helped Arsenal beat Sunderland 3–2 at home, on the first weekend of October. Second half goals from defender Kolo Touré and midfielder Tomáš Rosický against Bolton Wanderers, gave the team a seventh straight victory in the league. Arsenal played Liverpool on 28 October 2007, a match billed as the "first great test" of their title credentials. Steven Gerrard gave Liverpool an early lead, from a free-kick, but as the match went on, Arsenal began to dominate possession, eventually rewarded when Fábregas equalised in the 80th minute, from a Hleb through ball.

November–February
November began with a home match against Manchester United. Going into the match, both clubs were level on points and goal difference, at the top of the league. In the 45th minute, Gallas inadvertently scored an own goal to give United the lead, before Fábregas equalised early in the second half. Cristiano Ronaldo scored what was thought to be the winning goal, eight minutes from the end, but Arsenal equalised for the second time in the match via Gallas. The draw pleased Wenger, who after the game noted his team were "...still charge of the title race because we are top with a game in hand". A win against Reading at the Madejski Stadium on 12 November 2007 brought about Arsenal's 1,000th Premier League goal, scored by Adebayor. Reading striker Dave Kitson afterwards praised Arsenal's performance and asserted they were "the best team on the planet": "The thing that amazes you most is they are not just passing to each other – they are passing so that person can run on to the ball and then his mind is already made up what he is going to do next. It is just magic, it is unbelievable."

Late goals scored by Gallas and Rosický at home to Wigan Athletic kept Arsenal three points clear of Manchester United in the league table, at the end of November. The win at Villa Park against Aston Villa in December, moved Arsenal five points clear at the top of the league table, and provoked speculation as to whether the club could go another league season unbeaten; Wenger responded, "People will talk ... just let us play." The team played out a 1–1 draw at Newcastle United four days after and lost against Middlesbrough, ending a record of 22 league matches unbeaten. Arsenal beat Chelsea 1–0 on 16 December 2007 and needed a late goal, scored by substitute Nicklas Bendtner to win against Tottenham Hotspur. In spite of a draw at Portsmouth on Boxing Day, which moved Arsenal down to second place, a win against Everton helped the club move past Manchester United to the first-place spot.

On 1 January 2008, Eduardo and Adebayor each scored to earn Arsenal a win against West Ham United. The team dropped two points against Birmingham City, but a 3–0 victory at Fulham meant that Arsenal retained their first-place status. Goals scored by Mathieu Flamini, Adebayor and Fábregas helped Arsenal beat Newcastle United in the final week of January. The team became the first to reach 60 points in February, after winning 3–1 against Manchester City; Wenger described the feat as "phenomenal". Manchester City's defeat of Manchester United the following week meant a 2–0 win at home to Blackburn Rovers put Arsenal five points clear in first spot, with 12 matches to play.

The team then faced Birmingham City at St Andrew's. Shortly after kick-off, defender Martin Taylor was sent off and took no further part in the game, after his tackle on Eduardo. The player's challenge left the Arsenal striker with a broken leg; he was ruled out from action for the rest of the season. James McFadden scored through a free-kick in the 28th minute, before two Theo Walcott goals in the second half put Arsenal in the lead. In stoppage time, Gaël Clichy was penalised for a foul on Stuart Parnaby in the penalty area; McFadden scored Birmingham's awarded penalty to draw the match 2–2. It prompted Gallas to throw a tantrum: he attacked an advertising board situated on the side of the pitch and rested alone on the pitch, while his players headed for the dressing room. Wenger after the match called for a permanent football ban on tackler Taylor; he later retracted the comment.

March–May
A late equaliser at home to Aston Villa preserved Arsenal's lead at the top of the Premier League to only a point. A goalless draw at Wigan Athletic, was followed by a fourth consecutive draw in the league, at home to Middlesbrough. On the same day, Manchester United moved above Arsenal, who recorded a 1–0 win against Derby County. After Gallas missed a chance to score in the first half, Sagna put Arsenal in front, heading the ball into the goal net, from a corner in the 59th minute. Didier Drogba equalised for Chelsea in the 73rd minute and nine minutes later scored the winner, from a Nicolas Anelka flick-on. The result pushed Chelsea up into second place and moved Arsenal down one; both clubs were five and six points behind Manchester United respectively at the top. At the Reebok Stadium on 29 March 2008, Arsenal played Bolton Wanderers. The team went two goals down in the first half, both scored by Matthew Taylor and lost Abou Diaby, who was sent off for a foul on Grétar Steinsson. The team's "dramatic" comeback however, in the form of a winning goal in stoppage time, secured their first league win at Bolton Wanderers' ground in six years.

A 1–1 draw against Liverpool in early April, sandwiched in between Champions League legs between both teams "disappointed" Wenger, who refused to concede winning the title. Defeat to Manchester United at Old Trafford on 13 April 2008, however ended any realistic chance of overtaking the leaders, as United, the champions, needed two more wins to retain the title. Arsenal beat relegation-threatened Reading 2–0 the week after. Adebayor scored a hat-trick against Derby County on 28 April 2008, which made him the first player to score three goals, home and away against the same side in the same season. The win secured third place, pleasing Wenger who felt the team had a "great future – I believe we were really unlucky not to win something this year." Arsenal won their remaining two fixtures against Everton and Sunderland by a single goal, ending the campaign four points behind champions Manchester United.

Match results

Classification

Results summary

Results by round

UEFA Champions League

Third qualifying round

As Arsenal finished fourth in the league the previous season, the club played a qualifying round against Sparta Prague to ensure progression into the group stages. Goals from Fàbregas and Hleb in the away leg earned a 2–0 win and a 3–0 victory at home meant Arsenal qualified for a 10th successive season in the competition.

Group stage

The club were drawn in Group H, along with UEFA Cup holders Sevilla, Slavia Prague of the Czech Republic and Romania's Steaua București. Arsenal started their campaign in good stead, beating Sevilla 3–0 and followed the result with a 1–0 victory against Steaua București. Against Slavia Prague at the Emirates, Arsenal equalled their best ever victory in a European competition, scoring seven goals. Walcott, who scored his first two goals of the season in the match, earned the praise of manager Wenger: "Once Theo scored his first, you saw him much more. When they opened up the space, you could see his runs and pace, and the fact he is clinical in front of goal." Qualification into the knockout stages was ensured with a draw away to Slavia Prague on 7 November 2007. Defeat against Sevilla at the Ramón Sánchez Pizjuán Stadium was Arsenal's first loss since April 2007, ending a run of 28 matches undefeated in all competitions. The result moved them down into second place, and in spite of winning their final group match against Steaua at home, Arsenal ended two points behind group winners Sevilla.

Knockout stage

First knockout round
Arsenal was drawn against Champions League holders Milan in the knockout stages. In the first leg, Arsenal was held to a draw at home, with their best chance of winning the match coming in stoppage time; Adebayor headed the ball against the crossbar. A week later at the San Siro, the team produced a performance "with style, intelligence and discipline", to win the match by two goals to nil. In doing so, they progressed into the last eight and became the first English team to beat Milan, away from home.

Quarter-finals
In the quarter-finals, Arsenal played against fellow English club Liverpool, with the first leg at home. The two matches were played either side of a Premier League match between the two sides. Adebayor scored the first goal – he headed the ball from a corner, before Dirk Kuyt equalised three minutes later. Arsenal had a strong penalty appeal harshly turned down after Kuyt seemingly pulled Alexander Hleb in the penalty box and missed a chance to score a second goal, had Bendtner not managed to inadvertently clear Fàbregas' strike. In the return leg at Anfield, Arsenal made the better start of the two teams and took the lead when Diaby scored from a tight angle in the 13th minute. Sami Hyypiä equalised from a header before Fernando Torres received a long pass and swivelled to shoot the ball with his right foot, sending it into the top-left hand corner of Arsenal's goal. With five minutes remaining of the second half, substitute Walcott "covered some 80 yards at pace" to get past the Liverpool defenders and passed the ball for Adebayor, in the middle of the pitch to score. Touré moments after was adjudged to have fouled Ryan Babel and conceded a penalty kick; Gerrard converted the ball into the net to make the scoreline 4–3 on aggregate. In stoppage time Babel scored Liverpool's fourth, meaning they faced Chelsea in the semi-finals. Wenger in his post-match news conference questioned the "dodgy decision" to give Liverpool a penalty and commented the defeat was "not down to mental strength ... It was down to a lack of experience defensively."

FA Cup

Arsenal entered the FA Cup in the third round, where they were drawn to play Championship opposition Burnley. Goals from Eduardo and Bendtner, in either half of the match ensured victory for a "second-string" team. Against Newcastle United a fortnight later, a 3–0 victory meant Arsenal progressed into the fifth round, where they faced Manchester United away. The match played on 16 February 2008, ended in a "embarrassingly one-sided victory" for the home team; defender Emmanuel Eboué was notably dismissed for a high challenge on Patrice Evra.

League Cup

Arsenal began their League Cup campaign in the third round, drawn at home to Newcastle United. They made nine changes from the previous starting XI – Eduardo paired up with Bendtner in the front two. Bendtner scored the opening goal seven minutes from the end of normal time; Denílson added a second goal to ensure Arsenal's progression. Fourth-round opponents Sheffield United were easier to defeat, with Eduardo scoring a brace (two goals). The quarter-final pitted Arsenal away to Blackburn Rovers, in a match played on 18 December 2007. Diaby gave Arsenal the lead with a volley after six minutes and Eduardo extended the lead, before Roque Santa Cruz pulled a goal back for Blackburn, three minutes from the end of the first half. Santa Cruz scored the equaliser and his second of the match, heading in a cross by David Bentley. In stoppage time, Denílson was sent off for a two-footed challenge on Dunn. In spite of playing with one less player, Arsenal regained the lead. Alex Song passed the ball to Eduardo, who held off his opponent Ryan Nelsen and with minimal effort placed it past Brad Friedel. The performance prompted Wenger to assert that his team could win the cup, while opposing manager Mark Hughes commented that Arsenal's blend of young players were capable of following in the footsteps of Manchester United's fledglings, managed by Alex Ferguson.

Arsenal was drawn against Tottenham Hotspur in the two-legged semifinal. In the first leg, at the Emirates, Arsenal scored a late equaliser to even the tie at 1–1. However, a 5–1 victory for Tottenham in the return leg meant it was their first victory over their north London rivals in nine years. Wenger after the game defended his policy to play a young side, adding: "The only regret I have is to have played the players who should not have played."

Squad statistics

|}
[L] – Out on loan, [S] – Sold

Source:

See also

 2007–08 in English football
 List of Arsenal F.C. seasons

References

2007-08
ars